Peter McKay (23 February 1925 – 23 November 2000) was a Scottish footballer. He holds the record of being Dundee United's all-time top goalscorer, with 158 league goals and 202 overall. McKay also played for Burnley and St Mirren. He retired to Northamptonshire, where he died in 2000.

McKay was inducted into Dundee United's Hall of fame in 2009, with members of his family present.

References

External links 

1925 births
2000 deaths
Footballers from Fife
Scottish footballers
Association football forwards
Dundee United F.C. players
Burnley F.C. players
St Mirren F.C. players
Scottish Football League players
English Football League players